Roscoe Clyde Miller (December 2, 1876 – April 18, 1913) was an American right-handed pitcher in Major League Baseball who played parts of four seasons (1901–1904) with the Detroit Tigers, New York Giants and Pittsburgh Pirates. For his career, he compiled a 39–45 record in 102 appearances, with a 3.45 earned run average and 198 strikeouts. His nicknames were Roxy and Rubberlegs.

Baseball career
Miller was born in 1876 in Greenville, Indiana. He started his professional baseball career in 1896 and played in the major leagues from 1901 to 1904.

Miller's rookie season in 1901 was his best. He started 36 games for the Detroit Tigers in their first season in the new American League, and finished with a record of 23–13—the first 20-game season by a Detroit Tigers pitcher. In 1901, he also had 35 complete games (still an American League rookie record), 3 shutouts, 79 strikeouts, and a 2.95 ERA–89 points below the league average.  His Adjusted ERA+ of 130 was 5th in the AL behind Cy Young.  He was also among the league leaders in wins (4th) and winning percentage (6th) in the AL's inaugural season.

Two games in September 1901 illustrate his strengths and weaknesses.  On Labor Day 1901, the Tigers picked up 21 infield assists (including 12 by shortstop Kid Elberfeld) to support Miller—still the American League record for infield assists. Three days later, Miller lost his cool in an 11–9 loss to the Philadelphia Athletics, inexplicably lobbing the ball and grinning as the A's batter hit it, then throwing a bunt into the stands, allowing three runs to score.

Miller could not duplicate the success of his rookie season, losing 20 games in 1902, and never again having a winning record.  He was the first pitcher to record a 20-win and a 20-loss record in consecutive seasons. After a rough start to the 1902 season, Miller jumped mid-season to the New York Giants to play for newly-signed Giants' manager John McGraw.  Miller was 1–8 for McGraw and the Giants in the last half of 1902.  Miller played his remaining MLB seasons in the National League.

In 1904, Miller sprained his wrist in a carriage accident. He was riding with 14 Pittsburgh Pirates players when the rear wheel suddenly collapsed.  Several players, including Miller and Kitty Bransfield, were injured when the frightened horses bolted and dragged the carriage on its side.

After the 1904 season, Miller returned to the minor leagues. In 1906, he pitched for the Des Moines Champions of the Western League, where he led the circuit with a 28–15 record. His professional baseball career ended in 1909.

Later years
In the spring of 1912, Miller traveled to Virginia to try out unsuccessfully for a minor league club. He did not make the club and was described at the time as "down and out, and penniless." He died of tuberculosis one year later at his home near Corydon, Indiana, at age 36.

See also
List of Major League Baseball annual saves leaders

References

External links

Roscoe Miller - BaseballBiography.com

1876 births
1913 deaths
Major League Baseball pitchers
Detroit Tigers players
New York Giants (NL) players
Pittsburgh Pirates players
Atlanta Crackers players
Columbus Babies players
Columbus River Snipes players
Mansfield Haymakers players
Detroit Tigers (Western League) players
San Francisco Seals (baseball) players
Seattle Siwashes players
Des Moines Champs players
Fresno Tigers players
Oakland Commuters players
San Jose Prune Pickers players
Baseball players from Indiana
People from Floyd County, Indiana
20th-century deaths from tuberculosis
Tuberculosis deaths in Indiana